Henkie Waldschmidt (also spelled Henki, born 28 June 1988 in The Hague) is a Dutch racing driver. He has competed in such series as Eurocup Formula Renault 2.0 and the Formula Three Euroseries.

He started his racing career in 1995. In 2006 he joined the Young Drivers Program for the Toyota Formula One team. In December 2008 he had his first experience in testing a Toyota Formula One car.

References

External links
 

1988 births
Living people
Dutch racing drivers
Formula Renault Eurocup drivers
Italian Formula Renault 2.0 drivers
Formula 3 Euro Series drivers
Sportspeople from The Hague
Prema Powerteam drivers

SG Formula drivers